Embassy attack, attacks targeting embassies, may refer to:

1936 Attack on the United States embassy in Addis Ababa
1946 British Embassy bombing
1968 Tet offensive attack on US Embassy
1972 Israeli Bangkok Embassy hostage crisis
1973 Attack on the Saudi Embassy in Khartoum
1974 French Embassy attack in The Hague
1974 attack on the Japanese Embassy in Kuwait
1975 West German Embassy siege in Stockholm
1979 U.S. embassy burning in Islamabad
1980 Iranian Embassy siege
1980 Burning of the Spanish Embassy in Guatemala
July 1980 Athens attack
1981 Iraqi embassy bombing in Beirut
1983 United States embassy bombing in Beirut
1983 Turkish embassy attack in Lisbon
1984 United States embassy annex bombing in Beirut
1985 Turkish embassy attack in Ottawa
1992 attack on Israeli embassy in Buenos Aires
1994 London Israeli Embassy bombing
1995 Attack on the Egyptian Embassy in Pakistan
1995 attack on the Pakistani embassy in Kabul
1996–97 Japanese embassy hostage crisis
1998 United States embassy bombings
2001 Singapore embassies attack plot
2003 attack on Pakistan Embassy in Kabul
2003 Jordanian embassy bombing in Baghdad
2004 Australian Embassy bombing in Jakarta
2005 Indonesian embassy bioterrorism hoax
2008 Indian embassy bombing in Kabul
2008 attack on the United States embassy in Yemen
2008 attack on the Israeli embassy in Mauritania
2008 Danish embassy bombing in Islamabad
2009 Kabul Indian embassy attack
2009 United States bombing of the Chinese embassy in Belgrade
2009 bombing of Indian embassy in Kabul
2009 Pakistani Embassy attack in Tehran
2011 attack on the British Embassy in Iran
2011 attack on the Israeli Embassy in Egypt
2011 United States embassy attack in Sarajevo
2012 attacks on Israeli diplomats
2012 Benghazi attack
2013 Mogadishu Turkish embassy attack
2013 attack on Indian consulate in Jalalabad
2013 United States embassy bombing in Ankara
2013 Iranian embassy bombing in Beirut
2015 Spanish Embassy attack in Kabul
2016 attack on the Saudi diplomatic missions in Iran
2016 Kabul attack on Canadian Embassy guards
2016 Chinese Embassy in Bishkek bombing
2017 attack on the Iraqi embassy in Kabul
2017 Israeli embassy in Amman attack
2018 attack on the Iranian Embassy in France
2018 United States embassy attack in Podgorica
2019 North Korean Embassy in Madrid raid
2019–20 Attack on the United States embassy in Baghdad

See also
List of attacks on diplomatic missions
Attacks on U.S. diplomatic facilities
Havana syndrome, a set of medical signs and symptoms experienced by United States and Canadian embassy staff in Cuba